Nation's Little Sister or Nation's Little Brother is an informal title in South Korean entertainment industry. It refers to "a young female [or male] celebrity in her [or his] late teens to early twenties... [who is] cute, bright, and innocent."

People associated with the title

Nation's Little Sister

 Im Ye-jin (born 1959), actress
 Jang Na-ra (born 1981), singer and actress
 Moon Geun-young (born 1987), actress and model
 Park Bo-young (born 1990), actress
 Park Shin-hye (born 1990), actress and singer
 Yuna Kim (born 1990), figure skater
 Ahn So-hee (born 1992), actress and singer
 IU (born 1993), singer-songwriter and actress
 Son Yeon-jae (born 1994), rhythmic gymnast
 Lee Hye-ri (born 1994), actress and singer
 Kim So-hyun (born 1999), actress
 Kim Yoo-jung (born 1999), actress
Kim Sae-ron (born 2000), actress

Nation's Little Brother
 Ji Hyun-woo (born 1984), actor
 Lee Seung-gi (born 1987), singer, actor and host
 Park Bo-gum (born 1993), actor
 Yoo Seung-ho (born 1993), actor
 Yeo Jin-goo (born 1997), actor

Other usages
People's Little Sister (Korean: 국민 여동생) is a song by South Korean girl group Sonamoo from their debut extended play, Deja Vu.

References

South Korean culture